La Llaman Mariamor (They Call Her Mariamor) is a Venezuelan telenovela created by Crucita Torres and produced by Marte Televisión in 1996. The telenovela lasted for 181 episodes.

Roxana Díaz, Pedro Lander and Saúl Marín starred as the protagonists with Julie Restifo as the antagonist.

Synopsis 
La Llaman Mariamor (They Call Her Mariamor) is the story of Beba Marturano, a charming young woman and recent graduate with a degree in architecture. Beba has always lived in a comfortable life, her only suffering has been the loss of her father, Tomas Marturano. She first lost him when he divorced her mother, and again when he died in a suspicious accident far away from her. Beba grew up tormented by the hate her mother, Emerita, had instilled in her toward Mara Marturano and Brando Leon. She was led to believe that Mara and Brando were responsible for her father's dead. When destiny and Mara unite, Beba suffers an accident and lose her memory. During her bout amnesia, she falls in love with the man she hates most- Brando Leon. By the time she recovers, she has fallen completely in love with Brando. Their love is a seemingly impossible love because she is already married to Urbano Duran, a humble laborer who is consumed by a fervent jealously; Urbano suffers from a severe inferiority complex because he erroneously believes that his humble background and lack of education make him a lesser man in the eyes of Beba. As a result, he doubts his wife's love and sincerity. Eventually, Beba learns that Brando, deceived by Mara, was not her father's murder. She also discovers that Urbano, who has since graduated with a degree in engineering, has manipulated by Mara into believing a pack of lies which has led to his jealously. In the end, Beba is forced to choose between the two men who have played the most important role in her life: Brando Leon or Urbano Duran...

Cast 
 Roxana Díaz as Beba Marturano
 Pedro Lander as Brando Leon
 Julie Restifo as Mara Marturano
 Saúl Marínas Urbano Duran
 Loly Sanchez as Emerita Aristigueta
 Lourdes Valera as Francesca Aristigueta
 Miguel Ferrari as Yago Monteverde
 Carlos Marquez
 Yul Bürkle as Willy
 Deyalit Lopez as Azucena
 Nacarid Escalona
 Winston Vallenilla as Jhonny
 Alfonso Medina
 Jennifer Milano
 Ana Karina Casanova
 Juan Carlos Gardie
 Nacho Huett
 Elaiza Gil
 Rhandy Piñango
 Eric Noriega

References

External links
La llaman Mariamor at the Internet Movie Database

1996 telenovelas
Venezuelan telenovelas
1996 Venezuelan television series debuts
1996 Venezuelan television series endings
Spanish-language telenovelas